Sebaki Devi Das Tatma is a Nepalese politician, belonging to the Madhesi Janadhikar Forum. During the campaigns of MJF for Madhesi autonomy, Tatma took parts in rallies of the movement. Following the 2008 Constituent Assembly election, she was selected by MJF from the Proportional Representation quota to represent the party in the assembly. Prior to becoming a Constituent Assembly member, the 32-year-old Tatma worked as a domestic servant. She has four children.

References

Living people
Madhesi Jana Adhikar Forum, Nepal politicians
21st-century Nepalese women politicians
21st-century Nepalese politicians
Year of birth missing (living people)
Members of the 1st Nepalese Constituent Assembly